Paul VI: The Pope in the Tempest is a 2008 Italian television movie directed by Fabrizio Costa. The film is based on real life events of Roman Catholic Pope Paul VI.

Plot 
During the kidnapping of Aldo Moro, Pope Paul reflects about his life:
As the young priest  Battista Montini, he studies French philosophers with students (some of them would found the Christian Democracy) in spite of the Fascist pressure.
He is called to serve the Papal curia of Pius XII in Rome.
He watches how the Holy See and Fascist Italy sign the 1929 Concordat.
He tries to protect the victims of Fascism and Allied bombing during the World War.
He is sent as bishop of Milan, the biggest diocese.
There he approaches the workers and the poor, who feel the Church is far from them, in a campaign of mission for a "civilization of love".
He is made a cardinal by Pope John XXIII.
He is called to participate in the Second Vatican Council.
After the pope's death, he is elected the new pope.
He follows the work of the council.
The encyclicals he issues have uneasy receptions.
 is taken by some to encourage armed revolution against tyranny.
This includes Roberto, a young rebel man, son of a family friends of Montini.
Roberto argues with his parents and becomes more and more radicalized.
Pope Paul becomes a travelling pope.
He pilgrims to Jordan-administered Jerusalem, where he tries to bridge with the Eastern Orthodox Church.
In the Holy Land, the pope consoles an Arab Christian bed-ridden old man.
 disappoints those who expect the Church to accept a more modern view of sexuality.
At the same time, there are those who, like Marcel Lefebvre, reject the Council innovations.
The pope suffers because in spite of directly appealing to the Red Brigades, his friend the Italian prime minister Aldo Moro is executed.
However Roberto confesses that his appeal made him renounce violence.

Cast 

 Fabrizio Gifuni as Giovanni Battista Montini
  Mauro Marino as  Don Pasquale Macchi
 Antonio Catania as  Padre Giulio Bevilacqua
 Luca Lionello as  Don Leone
  Sergio Tardioli as  Don Primo Mazzolari 
  Claudio Botosso as  Roberto Poloni
 Licia Maglietta as  Maria Colpani
  Fabrizio Bucci as  Matteo Poloni
  Mariano Rigillo as  Cardinal Eugène Tisserant
  Giovanni Visentin as  Cardinal Francesco Marchetti Selvaggiani
 Sergio Fiorentini as  Cardinal Pietro Gasparri
 Luciano Virgilio as  Cardinal Ugo Poletti
 Pietro Biondi as  Cardinal Jean-Marie Villot
 Gaetano Aronica as  Aldo Moro
 Luis Molteni as  Angelo Roncalli
 Angelo Maggi as  Eugenio Pacelli 
 Nicola D'Eramo as  Marcel Lefebvre 
 Carlo Cartier as  Pope Pius XI
 Maciej Robakiewicz as  Karol Wojtyła

References

External links

2008 television films
2008 films
Italian drama films
Italian television films
2008 biographical drama films
Films set in the 20th century
Films set in Italy
Italian biographical drama films
Films about popes
Pope Paul VI
2008 drama films
Depictions of Aldo Moro on film
2000s Italian films